Cape Santiago may refer to:

Places 
 Cape Santiago, the southernmost tip of the Calatagan Peninsula in Calatagan, Batangas, Philippines
 Cape Santiago (Taiwan), a cape located in Gongliao District, New Taipei, Taiwan

See also 
 Cape Santiago Lighthouse, Philippines, a lighthouse located on Cape Santiago, Philippines
 Cape Santiago Lighthouse, Taiwan, a lighthouse located on Cape Santiago, Taiwan